Edwin Lewis Scofield (January 18, 1852 – January 14, 1918) was a member of the Connecticut Senate representing the 12th District from 1883 to 1884. He was the second mayor of Stamford, Connecticut, serving from 1895 to 1897.

He was born in Stamford. His parents were Erastus Ellsworth Scofield and Jane Ann (Brown) Scofield, both from Stamford.

On October 15, 1879, he married Annie Weed Candee, future sister-in-law of writer Helen Churchill Candee. They had a son, Edwin Lewis Scofield, Jr. (1887-1965).

Scofield graduated from Columbia Law School in 1873.

He was a director on the boards of Stamford Hospital, the Stamford YMCA, and the First National Bank of Stamford.

References

1852 births
1918 deaths
Republican Party Connecticut state senators
Mayors of Stamford, Connecticut
Republican Party members of the Connecticut House of Representatives
Columbia Law School alumni
19th-century American politicians